Culicoides is a genus of biting midges in the family Ceratopogonidae. There are over 1000 species in the genus, which is divided into many subgenera. Several species are known to be vectors of various diseases and parasites which can affect animals. Like Leptoconops, the genus has a long fossil record, with earliest known fossils being from Burmese amber, around 99 million years old.

Notable taxa
The systematics and taxonomy of this genus are confused. A large number of species are of unknown relations to those that have been assigned to subgenera already. Furthermore, many subgenera are sometimes elevated to full genus status, or additional genera (such as Paradasyhelea) are included as subgenera herein.

A widely cited, periodically updated, subgeneric classification of species of Culicoides begins with the warning that the traditional approach to classification of species in this genus has led to "phylogenetic chaos". Some of the specific consequences are mentioned, as well as recommendations for future work. A molecular phylogeny based on 42 species from 3 continents was proposed in 2017. In this work, the authors found that the subgenera Monoculicoides, Culicoides, Haematomyidium, Hoffmania, Remmia and Avaritia (including the main vectors of bluetongue virus disease) were monophyletic, whereas the subgenus Oecacta was paraphyletic. The study validated the subgenus Remmia (= Schultzei group) as a valid subgenus, outside of the subgenus Oecacta. The authors also considered that in Europe, Culicoides obsoletus, Culicoides scoticus and Culicoides chiopterus should be part of the Obsoletus complex whereas Culicoides dewulfi should be excluded from this complex. The authors concluded that the current Culicoides classification needed to be revisited with modern tools.

Subgenus Avaritia

Culicoides brevitarsis - suspected as vector of Akabane and Aino virus
Culicoides imicola - main vector of bluetongue virus and African Horse Sickness in Southern Europe
Culicoides chiopterus -
Culicoides dewulfi -
Culicoides obsoletus -
Culicoides scoticus -
Subgenus Beltranmyia
Culicoides circumscriptus
Culicoides crepuscularis
Culicoides manchuriensis
Culicoides salinarius
Subgenus Culicoides
Culicoides boyi
Culicoides delta
Culicoides fagineus
Culicoides grisescens
Culicoides impunctatus (Highland midge) - vector for Haemoproteus spp.
Culicoides kalix
Culicoides newsteadi
Culicoides nipponensis
Culicoides pulicaris
Culicoides punctatus
Culicoides selandicus
Subgenus Drymodesmyia
Culicoides loughnani
Subgenus Haematomyidium
Culicoides insinuatus
Culicoides paraensis - vector of Oropouche virus
Subgenus Haemophoructus
Culicoides gemellus
Subgenus Hoffmania
Culicoides foxi
Culicoides fusipalpis 
Culicoides ignacioi 
Culicoides insignis 
Culicoides lutzi 
Culicoides maruim 
Culicoides paramaruim
Subgenus Macfiella
Culicoides phlebotomus 
Subgenus Meijerehelea
Culicoides guttifer
Subgenus Monoculicoides
Culicoides nubeculosus
Culicoides variipennis
Subgenus Oecacta
Culicoides furens  transmits Mansonella ozzardi
Subgenus Remmia
Culicoides oxystoma
Subgenus Tokunagahelea
Culicoides pygmaeus
Subgenus Trithecoides
Culicoides anophelis

Species incertae sedis include:
 limai group
Culicoides limai
 fluviatilis group
Culicoides fluviatilis
Culicoides leopodoi
 reticulatus group
Culicoides guyanensis
Culicoides paucienfuscatus
Culicoides reticulatus

Description

Adults are small dark insects about 1–3 mm long. The antennae are long (15 segments) densely haired in the males and less hairy in females.  The thorax is hooped and carries a pair of broad mottled wings. Only the first two longitudinal veins are distinct. Midges are morphologically distinct from mosquitoes, lacking a proboscis, limiting their ability to bite through clothing.

Both males and females feed on nectar, however only the females take a blood meal, which is needed for the maturation of fertilized eggs. Females typically bite at dusk or dawn often in dense swarms and usually in the vicinity of water, marshes or rotting vegetation.

Life cycle
Females lay their eggs en masse in a range of habitats ranging from water vegetation, slow running streams, damp soil or on manure heaps. These hatch into tiny smooth white larvae with four pairs of anal gills. Pupae consist of a fused cephalothorax with slender respiratory trumpets and a segmented abdomen.
Adults emerge through a straight slit after 3–7 days.

Species of Culicoides feed on a variety of mammal hosts, including humans. The bite of Culicoides is felt as a sharp prick and is often followed by irritating lumps that may disappear in a few hours or last for days.

Culicoides as a vector
Various Culicoides species have been shown to be vectors for the following viruses and conditions: Mansonella spp. (M. ozzardi, M. perstans, M. streptocerca), Onchocerca gibsoni and O. cervicalis, Leucocytozoon, Plasmodium agamae, bluetongue virus, Schmallenberg virus, African horse sickness, bovine ephemeral fever (C. osystoma and C. nipponesis), Akabane virus, Queensland itch and epizootic hemorrhagic disease. A typical cycle of transmission of a virus by Culicoides is illustrated in the article Parasitic flies of domestic animals. Three species of Culicoides are established vectors for three species of Apicomplexan parasites of the genus Hepatocystis.

Bluetongue vectors in Northern Europe
In 2006, bluetongue virus was first recorded in Northern Europe. In 2007 and 2008, there were huge outbreaks, going as far as Norway, but in 2009 the outbreak was smaller. The main vector of the virus in Southern Europe does not live in Northern Europe, so other species have been screened. Species belonging to the Culicoides obsoletus complex and the Culicoides pulicaris complex have been found capable of bluetongue transmission.

See also
 List of Culicoides species

References

 
Chironomoidea genera
Veterinary entomology
Taxa named by Pierre André Latreille